Saddles and Sagebrush is a 1943 American musical Western film directed by William Berke and starring Russell Hayden, Dub Taylor and Ann Savage.

The film's sets were designed by the art director Lionel Banks.

Cast
 Russell Hayden as Lucky Randall  
 Dub Taylor as Cannonball  
 Ann Savage as Ann Parker  
 Bob Wills as Bob -Texas Playboys Band Leader  
 The Texas Playboys as Cowhands, Musician 
 William Wright as Krag Savin  
 Frank LaRue as Lafe Parker  
 Wheeler Oakman as Henchman Ace Barko  
 Edmund Cobb as Henchman Cutter  
 Jack Ingram as Henchman Trigger  
 Joe McGuinn as Henchman Blackie

References

Bibliography
 Morton, Lisa & Adamson, Kent. Savage Detours: The Life and Work of Ann Savage. McFarland, 2009.

External links
 

1943 films
1940s Western (genre) musical films
1940s English-language films
American Western (genre) musical films
Columbia Pictures films
Films directed by William A. Berke
American black-and-white films
1940s American films